Attorney General Douglas may refer to:

Ian Douglas (politician) (fl. 2000s), Attorney General of Dominica
Paul L. Douglas (1927–2012), Attorney General of Nebraska
Robert Dick Douglas (1875–1960), Attorney General of North Carolina
Samuel Douglas (1781–1833), Attorney General of Pennsylvania
Wallace B. Douglas (1852–1930), Attorney General of Minnesota